Douglas Arthur Kellermeyer (born June 1, 1961) is a former American football tackle who played three games for the Houston Oilers of the National Football League in 1987. He played college football at BYU.

References 

Living people
1961 births
American football offensive tackles
BYU Cougars football players
Houston Oilers players